Virginia Rounding (born October 1956) is an author and literary critic who specialises in Russia and women's history.

She has written a number of works on Parochial church council management with Martin Dudley.

Selected publications

References

External links 
 
 
 

Living people
1956 births
British non-fiction writers
British biographers
21st-century British women writers
21st-century British writers
Women biographers